Abdul Salam (9 October 1946 – 19 December 2018) was an Indian actor in Malayalam cinema known by his stage name Geetha Salam, known for Malabar Wedding, Jalolsavam (2004) and Mylanchi Monchulla Veedu (2014). He lived in Krishnapuram, Alappuzha, Kerala. He performed in about 82 Films and some TV series.

Personal life
He was married to Rahmath, and was survived by two sons, Shan and Shafeer.

Career 
He started his career as a Dramatist artist with the drama group Geetha.  He started his film career in the Malayalam film Mani Koya Kurup (1979), directed by S. S. Devadas and produced by P. P. Jose. His second movie was Megasandesam (Horror movie), directed by Rajasenan and produced by K. Radhakrishnan. He performed in about 82 films and some TV series. He received the Kerala Sangeetha Nataka Akademi Award in 2010.

Filmography

 Vasanthathinte Kanal Vazhikal
 To Let Ambadi Talkies
 David and Goliath
 Outsider
 Ee Thirakkinidayil
 Vellaripravinte Changathi
 Roudram

Television series
Grand Kerala Circus (Media One TV)  2014
Akkamma Stalinum Pathrose Gandhiyum (Asianet)  2015
Eeran Nilav (DD Malayalam) 2014
Amala  (Mazhavil Manorama)  2013
Ammakilli (Asianet) 2011
Kuttichatan (Surya TV)   2008
Ellam Mayajalam (Asianet)  2005
Aa Amma (Kairali TV)  2007-2008

References

External links

 http://www.moviebuff.com/geetha-salam
 http://www.filmibeat.com/celebs/geetha-salam.html
 http://www.mangalam.com/news/tag/4265-geetha-salam.html
 https://www.mathrubhumi.com/movies-music/news/veteran-actor-geetha-salam-passes-away--1.3408768

1946 births
2018 deaths
Indian male film actors
Male actors in Malayalam cinema
Male actors from Kollam
20th-century Indian male actors
21st-century Indian male actors
Indian male television actors
Male actors in Malayalam television
Indian male stage actors
Male actors in Malayalam theatre
People from Kollam district
Recipients of the Kerala Sangeetha Nataka Akademi Award